Digitivalva is a genus of  moths in the family Acrolepiidae.

Species
The following species are classified:
 Digitivalva africana Gaedike, 1988
 Digitivalva amseli Gaedike, 1975
 Digitivalva arnicella Heyden, 1863
 Digitivalva artemisiella Moriuti, 1972
 Digitivalva asiatica Gaedike, 1971
 Digitivalva christophi (Toll, 1958)
 Digitivalva delaireae Gaedike & Krüger, 2002
 Digitivalva eglanteriella Mann, 1855
 Digitivalva exsuccella (Erschoff, 1874)
 Digitivalva granitella Treitschke, 1833
 Digitivalva hemiglypha Diakonoff & Arita, 1976
 Digitivalva heringi (Klimesch, 1956)
 Digitivalva hoenei Gaedike, 1971
 Digitivalva kasachstanica Gaedike, 1994
 Digitivalva longipennella (Moriuti, 1972)
 Digitivalva luteola Gaedike, 1988
 Digitivalva macedonica Klimesch, 1956
 Digitivalva minima Gibeaux, 1987
 Digitivalva nephelota (Bradley, 1965)
 Digitivalva occidentella Klimesch, 1956
 Digitivalva orientella Klimesch, 1956
 Digitivalva pappella Walsingham, 1907
 Digitivalva perlepidella Stainton, 1849
 Digitivalva peyrierasi Gibeaux, 1987
 Digitivalva pulicariae Klimesch, 1956
 Digitivalva reticulella Hübner, 1796
 Digitivalva seligeri Gaedike, 2011
 Digitivalva solidaginis Staudinger, 1859
 Digitivalva sibirica (Toll, 1958)
 Digitivalva trapezopa (Meyrick, 1914)
 Digitivalva valeriella Snellen, 1878
 Digitivalva viettei Gibeaux, 1987
 Digitivalva wolfschlaegeri Klimesch, 1956

External links
Digitivalva at funet

Acrolepiidae
Moth genera